Johanna Eleonora De la Gardie (1661 in Hamburg – 1708 in Stockholm), was a Swedish writer, poet, lady-in-waiting and noblewoman.

Biography 
Johanna was the daughter of Pontus Fredrik De la Gardie and Beata Elisabet von Königsmarck. She received a cultivated education, along with her sister Ebba Maria De la Gardie and her cousins Amalia von Königsmarck and Maria Aurora von Königsmarck; her sister became a respected poet and singer at court. Johanna became lady-in-waiting and, with her sister, a favourite of Queen Ulrika Eleonora of Denmark, and was also a friend of the queen dowager, Hedwig Eleonora of Holstein-Gottorp.

Johanna participated at the amateur theatre of the royal court, encouraged by Queen Eleanora. In the winter of 1683–84, a group of female courtiers performed the Swedish premiere of Iphigénie by Racine at court. In the play, Johanna acted the part of Iphigenie, Amalia von Königsmarck as Achilles, Aurora von Königsmarck as Clitemnestre, Augusta Wrangel as Agamemnon, and Ebba Maria De la Gardie as Eriphile. This is regarded as a significant event, the first play performed by an all–female cast in Sweden, as an introduction of French Classicism in Sweden.

She wrote the French poem Portrait d’Ismène for Ulrika Eleonora, and the German-language psalm Weich, Falsche Welt. She encouraged poets and writers; she is remembered as benefactor and teacher of the poet and politician Samuel Triewald.

In 1691, Johanna married her cousin, Count Erik Gustaf Stenbock. They lived in England until 1697, where she became popular at the English court of Queen Mary.

Notes

External links
 Anteckningar om svenska qvinnor  
 Svenskt biografiskt handlexikon 
 P. Hanselli, Samlade vitterhetsarbeten af svenska författare från Stjernhjelm till Dalin (1867)

Further reading
 

1661 births
1708 deaths
Swedish-language writers
Swedish women poets
17th-century Swedish women writers
17th-century Swedish poets
Swedish ladies-in-waiting
Swedish countesses
Swedish maids of honour
Swedish people of French descent
17th-century Swedish actresses
Swedish stage actresses
People of the Swedish Empire
Johanna Eleonora